We Want It All is one of only two songs the Rage Against the Machine vocalist Zack de la Rocha released while the band was disbanded. Out of the twenty or so tracks which De La Rocha and Trent Reznor of Nine Inch Nails collaborated on, this is the only track of those sessions which has been released. Produced by Reznor and recorded at Nothing Studio in New Orleans in 2003, "We Want It All" appears on the 2004 compilation album Songs and Artists that Inspired Fahrenheit 9/11.

Critical reception
CraveOnline stated: "The vocal track was true to Zack’s lyrical form, while the instrumentation had the drum-and-bass feel of Nine Inch Nails’ 'The Perfect Drug'."

Personnel
Zack de la Rocha - vocals
Steve Marcussen - mastering
David Bianco - mixing
Trent Reznor - production

References

External links
 'We Want It All' at Discogs.com

2004 singles
2004 songs
Song recordings produced by Trent Reznor